Daniel Ceccaldi (25 July 1927 – 27 March 2003) was a French actor.

He was born in Meaux, Seine-et-Marne, France. The mild-mannered Daniel Ceccaldi is famous as Claude Jade's father Lucien Darbon in François Truffaut's movies Stolen Kisses and Bed and Board. Note: Christine refers to him twice as "Lucien", not papa, indicating perhaps that he is not her biological father, echoing Truffaut's own experience. The American critic Bob Wade wrote about Ceccaldi in 'Stolen Kisses': "Claude Jade's parents are memorably played by Daniel Ceccaldi and Claire Duhamel. Ceccaldi’s role may represent the most pleasant and neurosis-free father in any movie of the era. He overflows with Dickensian warmth and geniality."

Selected filmography

The Lame Devil (1948) - Un laquais (uncredited)
Maya (1949) - Un serveur du bistrot (uncredited)
Les Miracles n'ont lieu qu'une fois (1951) - Un ami de Jérôme (uncredited)
Une histoire d'amour (1951) - Le militaire qui tire mal à la fête foraine (uncredited)
Judgement of God (1952) - Théobald - le commis de M. Bernauer et amoureux d'Agnès
Deux de l'escadrille (1953)
Un trésor de femme (1953) - Le docteur
Les amours finissent à l'aube (1953) - Fred, l'ami de Charlotte
Mam'zelle Nitouche (1954) - Le troisième réserviste
 Queen Margot (1954) - Henri d'Anjou
Caroline and the Rebels (1955) - Lieutenant Bogard
Frou-Frou (1955) - Le chevalier des Grieux
Nana (1955) - Le lieutenant Philippe Hugon (uncredited)
The Grand Maneuver (1955) - Un officier (uncredited)
 Madelon (1955) - Un militaire chez Maxim's
The Light Across the Street (1955) - L'amoureux en panne
Marie Antoinette Queen of France (1956) - Drouet
 Mannequins of Paris (1956) - Un ami de Barbara
Women's Club (1956)
Bonsoir Paris (1956)
Élisa (1957) - Le coiffeur
The Adventures of Arsène Lupin (1957) - Jacques Gauthier
Miss Pigalle (1958) - Dominique
Un témoin dans la ville (1959) - Le client du taxi italien
Dialogue with the Carmelites (1960) - L'officier
Dans la gueule du loup (1961) - Roger
Mourir d'amour (1961) - Richard Lanne
The Lions Are Loose (1961) - Georges Guichard
Famous Love Affairs (1961) - Antonio Villa (segment "Comédiennes, Les")
Arsène Lupin contre Arsène Lupin (1962) - Arsène Lupin (voice, uncredited)
Les Bricoleurs (1963) - La Banque
The Trip to Biarritz (1963) - Paul Bonnenfant
Les Veinards (1963) - Gros nounours (segment "Le repas gastronomique")
Pouic-Pouic (1963) - Pedro Castelli
Girl's Apartment (1963) - François
L'homme de Rio (That Man From Rio) (1964) - Police inspector
FX 18 (1964) - Noreau
La Peau douce (The Soft Skin) (1964) - Clément
Requiem pour un caïd (1964) - Inspecteur Belin
Patate (1964) - Michel - le barman
Les gros bras (1964) - Giovannelli
La bonne occase (1965) - Le vendeur
Faites vos jeux, mesdames (1965) - Stéphane
Cent briques et des tuiles (1965) - Léon / Bartender
A Woman in White (1965) - L'inspecteur Georget (uncredited)
La grosse caisse (1965) - Pignol
God's Thunder (1965) - Le prêtre
La Métamorphose des cloportes (1965) - L'inspecteur de police Lescure
Quand passent les faisans (1965) - Barnave
Diamonds Are Brittle (1965) - Le capitaine du bateau
Espionage in Lisbon (1965) - Robert Scott
The Upper Hand (1966) - Le commissaire Noël
Le facteur s'en va-t-en guerre (1966) - Cassagne
Monsieur le Président Directeur Général (Appelez-moi Maître) (1966) - Calfarelli
Caroline chérie (1968) - Récitant / Narrator (voice, uncredited)
Les poneyttes (1968) - Letellier
Stolen Kisses (Baisers volés) (1968) - Lucien Darbon
 A Golden Widow (1969) - Le conservateur du musée
The Bear and the Doll (1970) - Ivan
Bed and Board (Domicile conjugal) (1970) - Lucien Darbon
L'Homme qui vient de la nuit (1971) - Inspecteur Coffinet
Le leonesse (1971)
Love in the Afternoon (1972) - Gérard
Pas folle la guêpe (1972) - Gérard Chardonnet
Trop jolies pour être honnêtes (1972) - Le lieutenant de marine Jean-Yves Marie Le Gouennec
Les zozos (1973) - L'oncle Jacques
Le complot (1973) - Louis Carat
Le concierge (1973) - Paul Raymond
La chute d'un corps (1973) - Alain Renon
Don't Cry with Your Mouth Full (1973) - Michel - le parrain
Amore (1974) - Le P.D.G.
Les quatre Charlots mousquetaires (1974) - Louis XIII / Le roi
O.K. patron (1974) - Duguet
France société anonyme (1974) - Michel, l'homme du gouvernement
Les Charlots en folie: À nous quatre Cardinal! (1974) - Louis XIII
C'est jeune et ça sait tout! (1974) - L'ambassadeur
Le chaud lapin (1974) - Henri Lambert
Dis-moi que tu m'aimes (1974) - Bertrand Danois
A Happy Divorce (1975) - Antoine
Incorrigible (1975) - Le préfet de police
Le Téléphone rose (1975) - Levêgue
The Toy (1976) - Le père de famille
The Porter from Maxim's (1976) - Du Velin
Le maestro (1977) - Hubert Martin
Death of a Corrupt Man (1977) - Lucien Lacor
Un oursin dans la poche (1977) - L'administrateur du théâtre
Holiday Hotel (1978) - Euloge St. Prix
La Ballade des Dalton (1978) - Lucky Luke (voice)
Ils sont fous ces sorciers (1978) - La Palière
Confidences pour confidences (1979) - Emile Roussel, le père
Le temps des vacances (1979) - Norbert
Charles et Lucie (1979) - Charles
Tous vedettes! (1980) - Jean-Paul
The Wonderful Day (1980) - Felloux
Celles qu'on n'a pas eues... (1981) - Guillaume
The Plouffe Family (1981) - Père Alphonse
For a Cop's Hide (1981) - Coccioli
Ça va faire mal (1982) - Léopold
Le braconnier de Dieu (1983) - Le père abbé
Adieu foulards (1983) - Gilbert Carboni
L'amour en douce (1985) - Maître Ravignac
Les Maris, les Femmes, les Amants (1989) - Jacques
Twisted Obsession (1989) - Julien Legrand
Barbara (1997) - Admiralen
Un grand cri d'amour (1998) - Sylvestre
Dieu seul me voit (1998) - Polling station président
Portrait, Le (1999, TV Movie) - Simon Hardelot
La vie ne me fait pas peur (1999) - Automobiliste
Michele Strogoff - il corriere dello zar (1999, TV Movie) - Count Krasow
Le fils du Français (1999) - Monsieur Oliver
Le Vélo de Ghislain Lambert (2001) - Maurice Focodel
Hôpital souterrain (2002, TV Movie) - Commandant Destouche
Elle est des nôtres (2003) - Le père de Christine
Au bout du quai (2004, TV Movie) - Gerfault (final film role)

External links

1927 births
2003 deaths
People from Meaux
French male television actors